Combined Systems, Inc. is a U.S.-based company (often marketed and produced under the brand name Combined Tactical Systems (CTS)), specializing in the manufacture of military and police equipment such as tear gas canisters, flash grenades, breaching munitions, and handcuffs. It supplies these products to police and military in the United States as well as Egypt and Israel. Evidence has also been collected by the War Resisters League that its products have been used to disperse protests in Tunisia, Chile, Bolivia, Guatemala, Germany, Netherlands, India, East Timor, Hong Kong, Argentina, Thailand, Trinidad and Tobago, Cameroon, Colombia, Sierra Leone, The United States and Egypt. Discovery of the use of tear gas produced by the US company in various police actions against demonstrations around the world was met with controversy in the social media discussions related to events of the Arab Spring. In February 2012, the online activist group Anonymous claimed to have hacked the company's website in retaliation for the company's supply of protest suppression weapons to various countries.

History 
The company was founded by Michael Brunn and Jacob Kravel and is owned by Point Lookout Capital Partners. On November 25th, 2019, MarketWatch, Inc. reported that the Carlyle fund holding Combined Systems’ stock has been closed, and its assets sold off. The company's main manufacturing plant is in Jamestown, Pennsylvania.

References

Weapons manufacturing companies